The 2007–08 Montreal Canadiens season was the Canadiens' 99th season of play and 91st in the National Hockey League. The Canadiens defeated the Boston Bruins by four games to three in the Eastern Conference Quarter-final before being eliminated four games to one by the Philadelphia Flyers in the Conference Semi-final.

Offseason events 

Key dates prior to the start of the season:
 The 2007 NHL Entry Draft took place in Columbus, Ohio, on June 22–23.
 The free agency period began on July 1.

Regular season 
Although some media picked the Canadiens to not make the playoffs, the team surprised the league with a large improvement in its play. The club won the Northeast Division title and placed first in the Eastern Conference. It was the team's first divisional title since the 1991–92 season. The team had not placed first in the Conference since the 1988–89 season.

The Canadiens retired two jersey numbers during the season with pre-game ceremonies at the Bell Centre. On November 19, 2007, the number 19 of defenceman Larry Robinson, a former member of the Big Three, was retired. On February 23, 2008, the number 23 of forward Bob Gainey was retired.

The Canadiens finished the regular season leading the NHL in power-play goals scored (90) and power-play percentage (24.06%). They also tied the Florida Panthers for the fewest shorthanded goals allowed, with three.

Highlights
 On October 10, 2007, goaltender Carey Price made his NHL debut, leading the Canadiens to a 3–2 victory over the Pittsburgh Penguins.
 On January 11, 2008, defenceman Andrei Markov was named to the All-Star Game starting roster.
 On February 19, 2008, the Montreal Canadiens came back from a 0–5 deficit against the New York Rangers to win the game in a shootout 6–5. This marks the first time in the franchise's 99-year history that they have ever come back to win a game after going down 0–5. This game was compared to some of the greatest games in team history.
 On March 1, 2008, the Montreal Canadiens took first place in the Eastern Conference for the first time since 1993 with a 2–1 win over the New Jersey Devils.
 On March 22, 2008, the Montreal Canadiens won their 11th consecutive game against the Boston Bruins dating back to March 2007, besting their previous win streak over the Bruins of 10–0 from the 1956–57 NHL season.

Final standings
Northeast Division

 Eastern Conference

Game log 
 Green background indicates win (2 points).   
 White background indicates overtime/shootout loss (1 point).
 Red background indicates regulation loss (0 point).

October 
Record: 6–2–3; Home: 2–1–2; Road: 4–1–1.

November 
Monthly record: 7–7–0; Home: 3–3–0; Road: 4–4–0.
Season record: 13–9–3; Home: 5–4–2; Road: 8–5–1.

* Unsuccessful penalty shot for Roman Hamrlik vs Philadelphia Flyers on November 1, 2007.

December 
Monthly record: 6–4–4; Home: 1–3–2; Road: 5–1–2.
Season record: 19–13–7; Home: 6–7–4; Road: 13–6–3.

January 
Monthly record: 8–2–2; Home: 4–1–1; Road: 4–1–1.
Season record: 27–15–9; Home: 10–8–5; Road: 17–7–4.

February 
Monthly record: 8–6–0; Home: 5–4–0; Road: 3–2–0.
Season record: 35–21–9; Home: 15–12–5; Road: 20–9–4.

March 
Monthly record: 9–4–1; Home: 5–1–1; Road: 4–3–0.
Season record: 44–25–10; Home: 20–13–6; Road: 24–12–4.

* Unsuccessful penalty shot for Chris Higgins vs. Toronto Maple Leafs on March 29, 2008.

April 
Monthly record: 3–0–0; Home: 2–0–0; Road: 1–0–0.
Season record: 47–25–10; Home: 22–13–6; Road: 25–12–4.

Playoffs 
The Montreal Canadiens clinched a playoff spot following a 7–5 victory against the Ottawa Senators on March 24, 2008, their 77th game of the season. They were the first team in the East to clinch a spot in the playoffs, won the Northeast Division and finished first in the Eastern Conference with 104 points, their highest total since the 1988–89 season.

Eastern Conference Quarter-finals: vs. (8) Boston Bruins
The Montreal Canadiens earned the top seed in the Eastern Conference by virtue of finishing with the highest point total in the conference. Some rioting occurred in downtown Montreal after the Canadiens defeated the Boston Bruins in the seventh game of the quarter-finals and advanced to play in the semi-finals.

Eastern Conference Semi-finals: vs. (6) Philadelphia Flyers 

* Player scoring winning goal is shown in italics.

Player statistics

Regular season

Skaters

 One winning goal in SO for Andrei Markov on October 27, 2007, vs Pittsburgh Penguins.
 Tom Kostopoulos was suspended for one game on November 19, 2007, vs Ottawa Senators for a fight in the last 5 minutes of the previous game vs Boston Bruins.
 Two winning goals in SO for Andrei Kostitsyn on November 27, 2007, vs Toronto Maple Leafs and on January 17, 2008, vs Atlanta Thrashers. On January 31, 2008, vs Washington Capitals, his brother Sergei and him became the first brothers to score a goal each in the same game with the Montreal Canadiens uniform since Peter and Frank Mahovlich in March 1974.
 Corey Locke was on the official lineup on December 30, 2007, vs New York Rangers but did not play.
 One penalty shot goal for Sergei Kostitsyn on February 3, 2008, vs New York Rangers.
 One winning goal in SO for Saku Koivu on February 19, 2008, vs New York Rangers.
 One winning goal in SO for Saku Koivu on March 22, 2008, vs Boston Bruins.

Goaltenders

*The team has also allowed 6 game losing shootout goals and 6 empty net goals. These goals do not count towards a goalie's personal statistics.

Playoffs

Skaters 

 One unsuccessfully penalty shot goal for Andrei Kostitsyn on April 24, 2008, vs Philadelphia Flyers.

Goaltenders 

*The team has also allowed 2 empty net goals. These goals do not count towards a goalie's personal statistics.

Awards and records

Awards

Team awards 
On April 5, following the final home game against the Toronto Maple Leafs, the team announced its award winners for the season.

National Hockey League awards 
 Andrei Markov: All-Star starting defenceman

Records
 February 19 win against the New York Rangers was the largest comeback in franchise history after being down 0–5.

Milestones

Transactions
The Canadiens have been involved in the following transactions during the 2007–08 season.

Trades

Free agents

Free agent acquisitions

Players lost to free agency

Draft picks
Montreal's picks at the 2007 NHL Entry Draft in Columbus, Ohio.

Farm teams

Hamilton Bulldogs
The Hamilton Bulldogs remain Montreal's top affiliate in the American Hockey League in 2007–08.

Cincinnati Cyclones
Montreal has a joint affiliation with the Nashville Predators for the Cincinnati Cyclones of the ECHL in 2007–08.

See also
 2007–08 NHL season

References

Montreal Canadiens seasons
Montreal Canadiens season, 2007-08
Mon